Plattekill Mountain is a mountain in Greene County, New York. It is located in the Catskill Mountains south of Platte Clove. Indian Head Mountain is located west-northwest of Plattekill Mountain.

References

Mountains of Greene County, New York
Mountains of New York (state)